The 2008–09 Ukrainian Premier League season was the eighteenth since its establishment. The league was restructured and split off from the Professional Football League of Ukraine. It was officially named as the EpiCentre Championship of Ukraine in football.

Shakhtar Donetsk were the defending champions of the past season, having won their fourth league title. The season began on 16 July 2008 with a scoreless draw between Tavriya Simferopol and Dnipro Dnipropetrovsk. The last round of matches were played on 26 May 2009. A total of 16 teams participated in the league, 14 of which had contested in the 2007–08 season, and two of which were promoted from the Persha Liha.

Vorskla Poltava's Ahmed Yanuzi scored the first goal of the tournament on 18 July 2008 in the 72nd minute of an away match against FC Kharkiv. Dynamo Kyiv won their title several games before the end of the season after a home win against Tavriya Simferopol. Dynamo finished with a 15-point lead over the defending champions and current runners-up Shakhtar Donetsk.

Teams

Promoted
FC Illichivets Mariupol, champion of the 2007-08 Ukrainian First League – (returning after absence of a season)
FC Lviv, runner-up of the 2007-08 Ukrainian First League – (debut)

Location map

Managers and captains

Managerial changes

Qualification to European competitions for 2009–10
 After the 23rd Round, Dynamo Kyiv qualified for European football for the 2009–10 season.
 After the 26th Round, Shakhtar Donetsk qualified for European football for the 2009–10 season, while Dynamo Kyiv – for the 2009–10 UEFA Champions League with an away 1–0 win over Zorya Luhansk.
 After the 27th Round, Metalist Kharkiv qualified for European football for the 2009–10 season, while Dynamo Kyiv won the League's title with 3–2 home win over Tavriya Simferopol.
 After the 28th Round, Shakhtar Donetsk qualified for the 2009–10 UEFA Champions League with an away 3–0 win over Zorya Luhansk.
 After the 30th Round, Metalurh Donetsk qualified for the 2009–10 UEFA Europa League with the 0–0 home draw against Arsenal Kyiv.
 After beating Shakhtar Donetsk in the final of the 2008–09 Ukrainian Cup (1–0), Vorskla qualified for the Europa League play-off round, which qualified Metalist for the Europa League third qualification round and Metalurh for the second qualification round

Timeline of qualification

League table

Results

Round by round
The following table is a historic representation of the team's position in the standings after the completion of each round.

Top scorers

Season awards
The laureates of the 2008–09 UPL season were:

 Best player:  Darijo Srna (Shakhtar Donetsk)
 Best coach:  Mircea Lucescu (Shakhtar Donetsk)
 Best arbiter:  Andriy Shandor (Lviv)
 Best goalscorer:  Oleksandr Kovpak (Tavriya Simferopol)
 Fair play prize:  Dynamo Kyiv

Stadiums
FC Kharkiv played in Sumy, because Dynamo Stadium in Kharkiv which was recently bought by the club requires major renovations. The club returned to their home ground in April for their 24th Round game against Tavriya. Arsenal Kyiv, who also has a chronic problem with obtaining its own home ground, shared three stadiums in the first half of the season. Initially allowed to play at Lobanovsky Dynamo Stadium, Arsenal was forced to seek another home venue during its times financial hardship. Arsenal was spotted by Obolon Kyiv that let the club utilize the Obolon Stadium. As the problem continues to be unresolved with Arsenal's home field, they could possibly relocate from Kyiv, with some speculations of moving to Sumy Oblast.

Dnipro Dnipropetrovsk has moved this season to the newly built Dnipro Stadium, but still played some of its games at Stadium Meteor on occasion. Also Shakhtar Donetsk plans to move to the newly built Donbass Arena once it is completely built. FC Chornomorets Odessa, due to renovations at Chornomorets Stadium played its games in the second half of the season at Spartak Stadium.

Newly promoted FC Lviv decided to use Ukraina Stadium expecting to attract extra fans in Lviv. However, economic factors as well as poor performances and lack of support in the area the club decided after the winter break to return to their original home ground Kniazha Arena in Dobromyl. After one home game in atrocious conditions in early spring which damaged the pitch the club was forced to look to other venues (including Avanhard Stadium in Lutsk and Bannikov Stadium in Kyiv). Late in April FC Lviv returned for home fixtures at Kniazha Arena.

List of home stadiums

Auxiliary or former home stadiums

See also 
Ukrainian Premier League reserves 2008-09
Ukrainian First League 2008-09
Ukrainian Second League 2008-09
Ukrainian Cup 2008–09
UEFA Cup 2008-09

References

External links
 Ukrainian Football Premier League official page 
 soccerway.com

Ukrainian Premier League seasons
1